Stony Crossing is a locality in the south western part of the Riverina on the south bank of the Wakool River.

The Stony Crossing railway line from Kerang, Victoria reached Stony Crossing in March 1928, after the Murray River at Gonn Crossing.  Initially, there were three trains per week to Murrabit, with one continuing on to Stony Crossing.  Services were suspended between Murrabit and Stony Crossing in 1943.  The Stony Crossing station nameboard was relocated to the North Williamstown Railway Museum.

Stony Crossing Post Office opened on 16 October 1890 and closed in 1956.

Notes and references

Towns in the Riverina
Towns in New South Wales
Murray River Council